Nick Bromberg is an American sports columnist and author.  He currently writes for Yahoo Sports reporting on  college football and automobile racing.

References

External links
 Nick Bromberg at Yahoo Sports

American sports journalists